William F. Dowd (November 11, 1943 – April 21, 2018) was an American politician who served in the New Jersey General Assembly from 1978 to 1982.

He died on April 21, 2018, in Long Branch, New Jersey at age 74.

References

1943 births
2018 deaths
Republican Party members of the New Jersey General Assembly
People from Long Branch, New Jersey